William Wellesley-Pole, 3rd Earl of Mornington,  (20 May 1763 – 22 February 1845), known as Lord Maryborough between 1821 and 1842, was an Anglo-Irish politician and an elder brother of the Duke of Wellington. His surname changed twice: he was born with the name Wesley, which he changed to Wesley-Pole following an inheritance in 1781. In 1789 the spelling was updated to Wellesley-Pole, just as other members of the family had changed Wesley to Wellesley.

Origins

He was born as William Wesley, at Dangan Castle, the second son of Garret Wesley, 1st Earl of Mornington, by his marriage to Annie Hill, a daughter of Arthur Hill-Trevor, 1st Viscount Dungannon. He was the younger brother of Richard Wesley, later Marquess Wellesley, and the elder brother of Arthur, who became Duke of Wellington, and of Henry, who became Lord Cowley.

Early life
Wesley was educated at Eton (1774–1776) before entering the Royal Navy as a midshipman, serving in the Navy between 1777 and 1783; most notably aboard HMS Lion, a new ship launched in 1777, at the Battle of Grenada of 1779.

Pole inheritance

Due to the debts of their father, the Wesley family entered into financial stringency. This was partially alleviated following the death in 1781 of the childless William Pole, of Ballyfin in Ireland, his godfather and the husband of his great-aunt Ann Colley, who bequeathed his estates to Wesley, on the condition which was usual in such situations that he should adopt the surname "Pole". 

Pole was descended from Peryam Pole, third son of the antiquary Sir William Pole (1561–1635) of Shute House, Devon, a brother of Sir John Pole, 1st Baronet. He had married Ann Colley, the sister of Wesley's grandfather Richard Wesley, 1st Baron Mornington (1690–1758). This Wesley had been born Richard Colley, but had changed his name in 1728, following an inheritance, to Wesley. Thus it was that in 1781, in accordance with the Will of his great-uncle William Pole, Wesley changed his name to Wesley-Pole.

Political career
A Tory, Mornington was a Member of the Irish Parliament for Trim from 1783 to 1790, and of the British House of Commons for East Looe from 1790 to 1795, and Queen's County from 1801 to 1821. He served as Secretary of the Admiralty under the Duke of Portland between 1807 and 1809, and as Chief Secretary for Ireland under Spencer Perceval between 1809 and 1812, and was also a Lord of the Irish Treasury between 1809 and 1811 and Chancellor of the Irish Exchequer between 1811 and 1812. 

Mornington was sworn of both the British Privy Council and the Irish Privy Council in 1809. He served in Lord Liverpool's government from 1814 to 1823 as Master of the Mint. In 1821, he was elevated to the Peerage of the United Kingdom as Baron Maryborough, of Maryborough in the Queen's County (now Portlaoise, Co. Laois). 

In 1823, he was appointed Custos Rotulorum of Queen's County for life. From 1823 to 1830 he was Master of the Buckhounds and from 1834 to 1835 Postmaster General. From 1838 he held the honorary position of Captain of Deal Castle.

Succession to earldom
On the death in 1842 of his elder brother Richard Wellesley, 1st Marquess Wellesley and 2nd Earl of Mornington, he succeeded as 3rd Earl of Mornington.

Marriage and progeny
In 1784, Lord Mornington married Katherine Elizabeth Forbes, daughter of Admiral John Forbes and granddaughter of George Forbes, 3rd Earl of Granard, and of William Capell, 3rd Earl of Essex. It was said that among the 1st Earl's sons, they had the only happy marriage. They had the following progeny, one son and three daughters:

William Pole-Tylney-Long-Wellesley, 4th Earl of Mornington, (1788–1857), who inherited his father's titles. 
Lady Mary Charlotte Anne Wellesley (1786–1845), who married Sir Charles Bagot, Bart., G.C.B., on 22 July 1806. The couple had four sons and six daughters. The family accompanied their parents to Canada on the appointment of Sir Charles Bagot as Governor-General of British North America, on 12 January 1842. As the wife of a Governor-General in Canada, Lady Bagot assumed the title of 'Her Excellency', in Montreal in August 1842. After her husband's death at Kingston, Ontario on 18 May 1843, she accompanied the remains to England. She died in London on 2 February 1845.
Lady Emily Harriet (1792–1881), who in 1814 married Lord FitzRoy Somerset, later 1st Baron Raglan.
Lady Priscilla Anne (1793–1879), who married John Fane, Lord Burghersh, later 11th Earl of Westmorland.

Death
He died on 22 February 1845.

References
royalmintmuseum.org.uk, William Wellesley-Pole, Master of the Mint

Notes

External links 
 

1763 births
1845 deaths
19th-century Irish people
British MPs 1790–1796
Captains of Deal Castle
Chancellors of the Exchequer of Ireland
Peers of the United Kingdom created by George IV
William Wellesley-Pole, 3rd Earl of Mornington
Irish MPs 1783–1790
Masters of the Mint
Members of the Parliament of Great Britain for constituencies in Cornwall
Members of the Parliament of Ireland (pre-1801) for County Meath constituencies
Members of the Privy Council of the United Kingdom
Members of the Privy Council of Ireland
Members of the Parliament of the United Kingdom for Queen's County constituencies (1801–1922)
People educated at Eton College
People from County Meath
Irish expatriates in England
Royal Navy officers
UK MPs 1801–1802
UK MPs 1802–1806
UK MPs 1806–1807
UK MPs 1807–1812
UK MPs 1812–1818
UK MPs 1818–1820
UK MPs 1820–1826
Mornington, E3
UK MPs who were granted peerages
United Kingdom Postmasters General
Commissioners of the Treasury for Ireland
Chief Secretaries for Ireland
Masters of the Buckhounds
Earls of Mornington